Tapola is a surname. Notable people with the surname include:

Jarkko Tapola (born 1944), Finnish sprinter 
Jussi Tapola (born 1974), Finnish ice hockey coach
 Mervi Tapola  (1954–2019), heiress

Finnish-language surnames